The Belvidere Historic District is in Belvidere, the county seat of Warren County, New Jersey. It was added to the National Register of Historic Places on October 3, 1980 for its significance in architecture, commerce, community planning, industry, politics and government during the 19th century. The district is bounded by Market and Race streets; Greenwich and Mansfield avenues; and the Pequest River. It includes 228 contributing buildings. Contributing properties include the Warren County Courthouse and the Twin Mills.

Gallery of contributing properties

References

Belvidere, New Jersey
Buildings and structures in Warren County, New Jersey
Federal architecture in New Jersey
Greek Revival architecture in New Jersey
Historic districts on the National Register of Historic Places in New Jersey
National Register of Historic Places in Warren County, New Jersey
New Jersey Register of Historic Places
Victorian architecture in New Jersey